John Lovell may refer to:

John Lovell (grocer) (c. 1851–1913), businessman in Los Angeles, California
John C. Lovell (born 1967), American sailor
John Harvey Lovell (1860–1939), entomologist in Maine

See also
Lovell (surname)